Aretha Now is the thirteenth studio album by American singer Aretha Franklin, released on June 14, 1968, by Atlantic Records. Quickly certified Gold, it eventually reached a million in US sales.  It hit No. 3 on Billboard'''s album chart. In 1993, it was reissued on CD through Rhino Records. The album was rated the 133rd best album of the 1960s by Pitchfork''.

Track listing
Information is based on the album’s Liner Notes

Personnel
Information is based on the album’s Liner Notes
Aretha Franklin – lead vocals (all), piano (1-5, 7, 10)
Tommy Cogbill – guitar (1-3, 10), bass guitar (6, 8-9)
Carolyn Franklin – background vocals (6, 8-9)
Roger Hawkins – drums (all)
Jerry Jemmott – bass guitar (1-5, 7, 10) 
Jimmy Johnson – guitar (1, 3, 5-6, 8-10)
Spooner Oldham – Hammond organ (1, 5), electric piano (3, 6-7, 10), piano (8)
The Sweet Inspirations – background vocals (all)
Bobby Womack – guitar (6, 8-9)
Horns:
Floyd Newman – baritone saxophone
Willie Bridges – baritone saxophone (1, 3-5, 7, 10)
Charles Chalmers, Andrew Love – tenor saxophone
King Curtis, Seldon Powell – tenor saxophone 
Bernie Glow, Wayne Jackson, Melvin Lastie, Joe Newman – trumpet
Haywood Henry – baritone saxophone (6, 8)
Tony Studd – bass trombone
Frank Wess – tenor saxophone, flute
All arrangements by Tom Dowd and Arif Mardin
Tom Dowd – engineering

Charts
Billboard Music Charts (North America)

See also
Album era
List of Billboard number-one R&B albums of the 1960s

References 

1968 albums
Aretha Franklin albums
Albums arranged by Arif Mardin
Albums produced by Jerry Wexler
Atlantic Records albums